Asociación Deportiva San Carlos is a Costa Rican football team based in Ciudad Quesada, the capital of San Carlos, Alajuela. They currently play in the Costa Rican First Division. Their home stadium is Estadio Carlos Ugalde Álvarez.

History
The club was founded on 9 May 1965, after local clubs El Refugio and El Maravilla merged to become Selección de San Carlos and winning promotion to the Primera División in 1965. They were relegated in 1971 and stayed in the Second División until returning at the top level in 1978. In 2004 they were relegated again after 25 years in the Primera, staying in the second tier for another two years. In May 2006 they beat Cartagena in a promotion playoff final and from 2006 through 2013 they were in the Primera before descending once more in 2013. They returned to the top flight in 2016, after defeating A.S. Puma Generaleña 3–2 on aggregate in the Segunda División final. However, the next season they got relegated again.

In 2018, San Carlos defeated A.D.R. Jicaral 5–4 on aggregate in another playoff final (their 6th second tier title) to return to the Primera División. In 2019, the club got its first top flight title by defeating Deportivo Saprissa in the final on away goals (1-1 aggregate), to become the first northern Costa Rica team to become champions.

Current squad
As of February 20, 2023

Honours

League 
 Primera División de Costa Rica
Winners (1): Clausura 2019
 Segunda División de Costa Rica
Winners (6): 1965, 1977, 1978, 2006, 2016, 2018

Championship Clausura 2019
List of players and coaching staff who won the Costa Rica First Division National Soccer Championship on 2019.

Top scores

References

External links
 Official site

Football clubs in Costa Rica
Association football clubs established in 1965
1965 establishments in Costa Rica